Undercover: The True Story of Britain's Secret Police is a 2012 book by The Guardian journalists Rob Evans and Paul Lewis.

Synopsis
The book investigates the infiltration of political activist groups in the United Kingdom by police forces, such as the Metropolitan Police. Groups targeted included those of the revolutionary left, far-right, and apolitical community campaigners. One police infiltrator, Bob Lambert was accused by a Member of the House of Commons of participating in a firebombing on a retailer selling fur. Lambert has also admitted fathering a child whilst undercover. Police stole the identities of deceased persons, often children, and created fake passports, licences and bank accounts.

Reception
Critical reception for Undercover has been positive. Alan White in the New Statesman wrote "Undercover compels the reader throughout, which is a testament to the investigative and writing skills of Evans and Lewis" and noted "the result is an example of the kind of classic, long-haul journalism that has, over recent years, produced scoops that have rattled the establishment, provoked multiple police inquiries and offered up an extraordinary series of revelations. The work of these authors is one of the best arguments in favour of a free press you’ll ever read." Marc Hudson in Peace News advised "activists really must read this book. They should share it, discuss it and learn from it".

The book was also featured in a piece in the London Review of Books.

References

External links
 The Spy Who Loved Me at The New Yorker

2012 non-fiction books
Books about anarchism
Books about counterterrorism
Books about politics of the United Kingdom
Books about activism
English-language books
Non-fiction books about espionage
Non-fiction crime books
Guardian Books books
Faber and Faber books